Arch/Matheos is an American progressive metal project.

History 
Arch/Matheos began as a reunion between founding Fates Warning members John Arch and Jim Matheos, who had not collaborated since Arch's 2003 EP A Twist Of Fate and had not fully collaborated for a whole album since 1986's Awaken the Guardian. In 2010, the duo began working on an album together and brought along three Fates Warning members to the fold. The five members would in turn release their debut album "Sympathetic Resonance" in 2011, under the name Arch/Matheos. The album, while only 6 tracks, clocked at 55 minutes. On August 17, 2018, they re-signed with Metal Blade records.

In August 2018, a follow-up album was announced for release in 2019. On March 29, 2019, Metal Blade announced the name of the album would be Winter Ethereal, and was released on May 10. To emphasize the project's distance from Fates Warning, Winter Ethereal featured numerous guest performers such as former Fates Warning members Joe Dibiase and Mark Zonder as well as musicians Steve Di Giorgio (Death, Testament, Charred Walls of the Damned), Cynic's Sean Malone, and drummer Thomas Lang.

Discography 
 Sympathetic Resonance (2011, Metal Blade)
 Winter Ethereal (2019)

Performers

Sympathetic Resonance 
 John Arch − vocals
 Jim Matheos − lead and rhythm guitars
 Frank Aresti − lead guitar
 Joey Vera − bass guitar
 Bobby Jarzombek − drums

Winter Ethereal 
 John Arch − vocals
 Jim Matheos − lead and rhythm guitars
 Joey Vera − bass guitar on Wanderlust, Never In Your Hands
 Bobby Jarzombek − drums on Wrath of the  Universe, Straight and Narrow
 Frank Aresti – guitar solos in Never In Your Hands, Kindred Spirits
 Joe DiBiase − bass guitar on Solitary Man
 Mark Zonder − drums on Wanderlust, Tethered
 Steve Di Giorgio − bass guitar on Vermilion Moons, Wrath of the  Universe, Straight and Narrow
 Sean Malone − bass guitar on Pitch Black Prism, Kindred Spirits
 George Hideous − bass guitar on Tethered
 Matt Lynch − drums on Kindred Spirits
 Thomas Lang – drums on Vermilion Moons, Solitary Man, Pitch Black Prism
 Baard Kolstad – drums on Never In Your Hands

References

External links 
 The official Arch/Matheos site

American progressive metal musical groups
Musical groups established in 2010
Metal Blade Records artists
2010 establishments in California